Przeworno is a village in Strzelin County, Lower Silesian Voivodeship, in south-western Poland. It is the seat of the administrative district (gmina) called Gmina Przeworno. Prior to 1945 it was in Germany.

The village has a population of 1,259.

Notable residents
 Max Drischner, German organist and composer
 Friedrich-Wilhelm von Loeper (1888–1983), Wehrmacht general

References

Villages in Strzelin County